Damansara Utama is a suburb of Petaling Jaya, Selangor, Malaysia.  The suburb is divided into two sections, SS20 in the east and SS21 in the west which are separated in the middle by the Damansara–Puchong Expressway, a heavily used six-lane expressway. It has a population of about 142,000 people.

It is also within the Sungai Buloh mukim (subdivision) of the Petaling District.

Also the place of death of Toh Puan Suhaila binti Tan Sri Mohammad Noah, wife of former (3rd) Prime Minister, Tun Hussein Onn.

Commerce
The Uptown in SS21 is the commercial hub of Damansara Utama, which houses offices, restaurants, opticians, fashion houses and other miscellaneous goods.

There are major and foreign banks that have set up their branches in the area.
 CIMB Bank
 Maybank
 Public Bank
 RHB Bank
 AmBank
 Hong Leong Bank
 Alliance Bank
 Standard Chartered
 UOB
 OCBC
 HSBC

Damansara Utama has its own shopping mall known as The Starling, while there are several other shopping complexes that are located in areas nearby such as Tropicana City Mall in SS2; 1 Utama in Bandar Utama Damansara; The Curve, IKEA, Ikano Power Centre in Mutiara Damansara; and The Atria at neighbouring Damansara Jaya.

Education

Primary and secondary education is provided by the Sekolah Kebangsaan Damansara Utama/Damansara Utama Primary school and SMK Damansara Utama/Damansara Utama Secondary School respectively. KDU (Kolej Damansara Utama) is in the vicinity.

Healthcare
The Damansara Specialist Hospital is in the adjacent suburb of [Damansara Kim] along Jalan SS 20/10. The hospital is managed by Kumpulan Perubatan (Johor) Sdn Bhd. It provides all the services, facilities and amenities of a modern hospital.

There are clinics and pharmacies in Damansara Utama closer to Uptown square.

Religion
Residents practice Islam, Buddhism, Christianity, Hinduism, Confucianism, Taoism and others.

Accessibility via public transport
Damansara Utama is accessible via Rapid KL buses and taxis. Rapid KL buses which operate through Damansara Utama are as follows:

780 : HAB Pasar Seni - Section 8 Kota Damansara via SEA Park, SS 2 Petaling Jaya - HAB Pasar Seni
800 : KL Sentral - Bandar Utama via Pusat Bandar Damansara - KL Sentral
802 : Kelana Jaya LRT - Section 6 Kota Damansara via Damansara Utama - Kelana Jaya LRT
T784 : Taman Bahagia LRT - Damansara Jaya - Damansara Utama - SEA Park, Section SS 2 Petaling Jaya - Taman Bahagia LRT

Geography
The street known as Jalan SS20/1 and Jalan SS20/10 spans Damansara Utama and Damansara Kim; Jalan SS20/21 separates Damansara Utama from Damansara Kim and bisects Jalan SS20/1 and Jalan SS20/10. Jalan SS20/10 in Damansara Utama is a street with residential units only while Jalan SS20/10 in Damansara Kim boasts residential and commercial units. The units along Jalan SS20/21 in Damansara Utama are odd-numbered while the units in Damansara Kim are even-numbered.

Damansara Kim is a nickname for Damansara Utama opposite Tropicana City Mall.

References

External links
Damansara Uptown Directory
SS20 Damansara Kim/Damansara Utama Neighbourhood
Damansara Specialist Hospital Website
Damansara Utama 21 Residence Group

Petaling Jaya